MDMB-FUBINACA (also known as  MDMB(N)-Bz-F and FUB-MDMB) is an indazole-based synthetic cannabinoid that is a potent agonist for the cannabinoid receptors, with Ki values of 1.14 nM at CB1 and 0.1228 nM at CB2 and EC50 values of 0.2668 nM at CB1 and 0.1411 nM at CB2, and has been sold online as a designer drug. Its benzyl analogue (instead of 4-fluorobenzyl) has been reported to be a potent agonist for the CB1 receptor (Ki = 0.14 nM, EC50 = 2.42 nM). The structure of MDMB-FUBINACA contains the amino acid 3-methylvaline or tert-leucine methyl ester.

Side effects 
There have been a large number of reported cases of deaths and hospitalizations in relation to this synthetic cannabinoid, mainly in Russia and Belarus. MDMB-FUBINACA was first reported in 2014 and quickly gained a reputation as the most deadly synthetic cannabinoid drug sold by 2015. Up to 700 hospitalisations and 25 deaths were initially linked to MDMB-FUBINACA in media and government reports, and subsequent testing confirmed that at least 1000 hospitalisations and 40 deaths had occurred as a consequence of intoxication by MDMB-FUBINACA as of March 2015.

Legal status

In the United States, MDMB-FUBINACA is a Schedule I controlled substance.

As of October 2015, MDMB-FUBINACA is a controlled substance in Belarus, Russia, and China.

In July 2021 it was included in Table II-A of the list of prohibited drugs of Portugal.

See also 

 5F-AB-PINACA
 5F-ADB
 5F-AMB
 5F-APINACA
 AB-FUBINACA
 AB-CHFUPYCA
 AB-CHMINACA
 AB-PINACA
 ADB-BINACA
 ADB-CHMINACA
 ADB-FUBINACA
 ADB-PINACA
 ADBICA
 APICA
 APINACA
 APP-FUBINACA
 MDMB-CHMICA
 MDMB-CHMINACA
 PX-3

References 

Cannabinoids
Designer drugs
Indazolecarboxamides
Fluoroarenes
Tert-butyl compounds